Southampton Women's FC is a women's football club based in Hampshire, England. The club is affiliated to the FA Women's National League and is an FA Charter Standard club. 

Founded in 1970, Southampton Women's FC is the most successful women's football team in Southampton. They are eight-time winners of the Women's FA Cup between the seasons 1970–71 and 1980–81, and twice runners-up.

History

Founded in 1970 by fans of Southampton F.C. men's team, Southampton Women's FC became the first WFA Cup (Women's FA Cup) winners in 1971, winning the Final against Stewarton Thistle. 

Southampton reached every WFA Cup Final in the competition's first nine seasons. They won the first three and won again in 1975, 1976, 1978, 1979 and 1981, with defeats in 1974 and 1977. Southampton is the city's most successful women's football club. They are eight-time winners of the Women's FA Cup, second only to Arsenal with 14 titles to their name.

Southampton returned to form, with the first team winning the Southern Region Women's Football League and League Cup in 2016–17. They gained promotion to the 4th-tier FA Women's Premier League (now National League), whilst the Reserves were unbeaten in the Hampshire County Women's League and won promotion to the Southern Region Women's Football League.

Former players

Pat Davies scored two of England's three goals in their victory over Scotland in 1972, as well as three of Southampton's goals in their 4-1 victory in the first Women's FA Cup.

Squad

As of 6 February 2019:

Teams
Minis, under-10s, under-13 Reds, under-13 Yellows, under-16s, Reserves, Firsts.

Honours
 WFA Cup (Women's FA Cup)
 Winners: (8) 1970–71, 1971–72, 1972–73, 1974–75, 1975–76, 1977–78, 1978–79, 1980–81
 Runners-up: (2) 1973–74, 1976–77
 Southern Region Women's Football League
 Winners: 2016–17
 Southern Region Women's Football League Cup
 Winners: 2016–17
 Hampshire County Women's Football League
 Winners: 2015–16

References

External links
 Official website

Women's football clubs in England
Football clubs in Hampshire
Association football clubs established in 1970
1970 establishments in England